Romantic Comedy 101 is a Canadian comedy / romance television film directed by Peter DeLuise and starring Natalia Cigliuti.

Plot
Igor Sullivan (Thomas Ian Nicholas) tells his new story to a film producer James Ford (Tom Arnold). His story is a love triangle involving Jennifer (Natalia Cigliuti), Patrick (Jeremy London) and Mark (Joey Lawrence). The writer and producer visualize the whole story sitting in the office and the film progresses. Mark and Patrick are two friends who work for an internet based magazine. Then comes a new girl in the office - Jennifer. Mark and Patrick both fell for her but Patrick hides his true feelings for the sake of his friend Mark. Mark is not really in love with Jennifer like Patrick. Mark just wants to sleep with her. This results in funny situations. Finally, Jennifer realizes that Patrick truly loves her and they end up together.

Cast
 Jeremy London as Patrick
 Joey Lawrence as	Mark Gibson
 Tom Arnold as James Ford
 Natalia Cigliuti as Jennifer
 Ingrid Kavelaars as Beth
 Thomas Ian Nicholas as Igor Sullivan

References

External links 
 

2002 television films
2002 films
Canadian comedy television films
2002 romantic comedy films
English-language Canadian films
Canadian romantic comedy films
Films directed by Peter DeLuise
2000s Canadian films